The S-element is an RNA element found in p42d and related plasmids. The S-element has multiple functions and is believed to act as a negative regulator of repC transcription, and be required for efficient replication and act as a translational enhancer of repC.

See also 
ctRNA

References

External links 
 

Cis-regulatory RNA elements